This was the first edition of the tournament.

Kristina Mladenovic won the title, defeating Valeria Savinykh in the final, 7–5, 5–7, 6–1.

Seeds

Draw

Finals

Top half

Bottom half

References 
 Main draw

Ankara Cup - Singles
Ankara Cup